Karl Vital Moor (11 December 1852 – 14 June 1932) was a Swiss communist, and a channel for German financing of the 19th-century European Bolshevik movement.

He was born in Fribourg, the illegitimate son of Swiss citizen Mary Moor, of Vordemwald, and the Swiss aristocrat Ernest de Stoeklin, of Fribourg. Moor studied at universities in both Switzerland and Germany. In the 1870s his passion for the ideas of socialism led him to take part in the banned Social Democratic Party of Germany. In the spring of 1881 he was expelled from Bavaria and then moved to Basel. There he became one of the more prominent functionaries of Swiss social democracy. In 1889 he lived in Bern, where he edited the social-democratic newspaper Berner Tagwacht. During this period he provided assistance to political exiles from Russia, as well as the leaders of the Peoples' First Polish Socialist Party, "Proletariat," and the Bolsheviks-Lenintsev.

On 4 May 1917, Moor had a report by the MFA of Germany, which reported that he had « «made probing a number of representatives of various groups of pacifist’s wing (in the Russians), the Socialists and they said that it would be very desirable that a systematic, intensive and effective campaigning in favor of peace would be maintained by someone of the well-known neutral comrades. After they were clear, and I would say, good willingness to accept financial support for it to work for peace, I said that for its part, would be happy to provide a substantial amount for such a noble, humane and international goals ».

He further suggested the following principles: The sponsor would guarantee that money would come from an unsuspected source,and that the sponsor or the mediator would be provided with entry into Russia with the money, and to implement an immediate allocation of funds in the form of cash, and the most appropriate form of cash would be the Swiss franc

As a result, in July 1917 Moor was in Russia and supplied the Bolsheviks a «loan» in the amount of 32,837 dollars, allegedly from the inheritance.

In 1922, Moor with great difficulty made a partial return «loan».

On 14 June 1932, Moor died in Berlin.

It was clarified that he was a German spy after World War I. His code name was "Bayer".

External links
 Л. Г. Соболев. Русская революция и немецкое золото
 Ю.Фельштинский. Еще раз о немецких деньгах
 Юрий Фельштинский. Вожди в законе
С. Ляндрес (Стэнфордский университет, США) Новые документы о финансовых субсидиях большевикам в 1917 году

Sources
 Haas L. Carl Vital Moor. 1852–1932. Ein Leben für Marx und Lenin. Zürish, 1970.
 Schurer H. Karl Moor – German Agent and Friend of Lenin // The Journal of Contemporary History. 1970. Vol. 5. 2.
 Dmitri Volkogonov. Lenin: A New Biography, Free Press, 1994 

Swiss communists
Bolshevik finance
German spies
Double agents
Swiss-German people
1853 births
1932 deaths
People from Fribourg